Admiral Sir Arthur Desmond Cassidi,  (26 January 1925 – 10 October 2019) was a Royal Navy officer who served as Commander-in-Chief Naval Home Command from 1983 to 1984.

Naval career
Cassidi joined the Royal Navy in 1938. Commissioned in 1943, he was promoted to sub-lieutenant in February 1944.

Cassidi was promoted to lieutenant in February 1946, and to lieutenant commander in October 1953. He became commanding officer of 820 Naval Air Squadron in 1954. In 1970 he returned to the Ministry of Defence as the Director of Naval Plans.

He went on to be Director-General, Naval Manpower and Training in 1975 and Flag Officer Naval Air Command in 1978. He then became Second Sea Lord and Chief of Naval Personnel in 1979 and Commander-in-Chief Naval Home Command in 1982. He retired in 1985.

Family and later life
In 1950 Cassidi married Sheelagh Marie Scott; they had one son and two daughters. Following the death of his first wife, he married Deborah Marion Pollock in 1982.

Cassidi lived near Langport in Somerset.

He died on 10 October 2019 at the age of 94.

References

|-

1925 births
2019 deaths
Knights Grand Cross of the Order of the Bath
Royal Navy admirals
Royal Navy officers of World War II